Various notable daily newspapers made endorsements of candidates in the 2016 United States presidential election, as follows. The table below indicates which candidate each publication endorsed in the 2012 United States presidential election and includes only endorsements for the general election.

Daily newspapers

Summary of daily newspapers

Endorsements by daily newspapers

See also 
 Newspaper endorsements in the United States presidential primaries, 2016

Notes

References

External links 
The American Presidency Project: 2016 General Election Editorial Endorsements by Top 100 Newspapers Based on Daily Circulation

2016 United States presidential election endorsements
2016 in mass media
Newspaper endorsements
2010s politics-related lists